Garhi Habibullah is a town and union council (an administrative subdivision) of Mansehra District in the Khyber-Pakhtunkhwa province of Pakistan. It is located in Mansehra Tehsil and lies to the east of district capital Mansehra, towards the Kashmir frontier (near to Muzaffarabad the capital of Azad Kashmir). 

It was affected by the 2005 Kashmir earthquake. It is named after (Ex-Chief Of Swati) Habibullah Khan. Its old name was Garhi Saadat Khan came from the town's founder who was ruler of Pakhli (1762-1780) and nominal Chief Of Swati Pashtun Tribe.

Sources 
 Imperial Gazzetter Of India (Topic: Pakhli Sarkar of Swatis)
 Mountstuart Elphinstone (1843): An Account of the Kingdom of Caubul
 Raverty H.G (1888): Notes on Baluchistan and Afghanistan
 Hazara Gazetteer 1883 and 1907
 Prof. Akhtar: Tajik Swati aur Mamlikat e Gabar
 Roshan Khan: Tazkira
 Rehmat Khan: Tareekh e Hafiz 
 Sher Bahadur Khan Panni.: Tareekh e Hazara
 The Pathans

References

Union councils of Mansehra District
Populated places in Mansehra District